The Cantharidinae are a taxonomic subfamily of very small to large sea snails, marine gastropod molluscs in the family Trochidae, common name top snails.

Originally it was ranked as tribe of the Trochinae, according to the taxonomy of the Gastropoda by Bouchet & Rocroi from 2005, but was elevated to the rank of subfamily following Williams et al.

Genera
 Agagus Jousseaume, 1894
 † Amonilea Cossmann, 1920 
 † Anceps Kolesnikov, 1939 
 Calthalotia Iredale, 1929
 Cantharidoscops Galkin, 1955
 Cantharidus Montfort, 1810
 Clelandella Winckworth, 1932
 Gibbula Risso, 1826
 † Gibbuliculus Harzhauser, 2021 
 Iwakawatrochus Kuroda & Habe, 1954
 Jujubinus Monterosato, 1884
 Kanekotrochus Habe, 1958
 † Kishinewia Kolesnikov, 1935 
 Komaitrochus Kuroda & Iw. Taki, 1958
 † Lesperonia Tournouër, 1874 
 Micrelenchus Finlay, 1926
 Nanula Thiele, 1924
 Odontotrochus P. Fischer, 1880
 Oxystele Philippi, 1847
 Pagodatrochus Herbert, 1989
 † Paroxystele O. Schultz, 1970 
 Phasianotrochus P. Fischer, 1885
 † Phorculus Cossmann, 1888 
 Phorcus Risso, 1826
 Pictodiloma Habe, 1946
 Priotrochus P. Fischer, 1879
 Prothalotia Thiele, 1930
 Pseudotalopia Habe, 1961
 † Rollandiana Kolesnikov, 1939 
 Roseaplagis K. M. Donald & Spencer, 2016
 † Sarmatigibbula Sladkovskaya, 2017 
 † Sinzowia Kolesnikov, 1935 †
 Steromphala Gray, 1847
 Thalotia Gray, 1847
† Timisia Jekelius, 1944 
 Tosatrochus MacNeil, 1961
Genera brought into synonymy 
 Aphanotrochus Martens, 1880: synonym of Priotrochus P. Fischer, 1879
 Elenchus Swainson, 1840: synonym of Cantharidus Montfort, 1810
 Korenia Friele, 1877: synonym of Gibbula Risso, 1826
 Limax Martyn, 1784: synonym of Cantharidus Montfort, 1810
 Mawhero Marshall, 1998  synonym of Cantharidus Montfort, 1810
 Osilinus Philippi, 1847: synonym of Phorcus Risso, 1826
 Plumbelenchus Finlay, 1926: synonym of Cantharidus Montfort, 1810
 Scrobiculinus Monterosato, 1889: synonym of Gibbula Risso, 1826
 Steromphala Gray, 1847: synonym of Gibbula Risso, 1826
 Strigosella Sacco, 1896: synonym of Scrobiculinus Monterosato, 1889
 Trochinella Iredale, 1937: synonym of Calliotrochus P. Fischer, 1879
 Trochocochlea Mörch, 1852: synonym of Phorcus Risso, 1826

References

Trochidae